For the 1997 Vuelta a España, the field consisted of 198 riders; 125 finished the race.

By rider

By nationality

References

1997 Vuelta a España
1997